Nazmul Hussain (born 4 July 1948) is an Indian first-class cricketer who represented Rajasthan. He made his first-class debut for Rajasthan in the 1968-69 Ranji Trophy on 6 December 1968.

References

External links
 

1948 births
Living people
Indian cricketers
Rajasthan cricketers